Gateway Bridge may refer to:
 Sir Leo Hielscher Bridges or Gateway Bridge, in Brisbane, Queensland, Australia
 Gateway International Bridge, a bridge between Brownsville, Texas, United States and Matamoros, Tamaulipas, Mexico
 Thames Gateway Bridge, a proposed new crossing of the River Thames, in east London, England
 Gateway Bridge (Illinois-Iowa), over the Mississippi River, in Clinton, Iowa, United States
 Gateway Bridge (Michigan), in Taylor, Michigan
 Korean War Veterans Memorial Bridge or Gateway Bridge, in Nashville, Tennessee, U.S.

See also
 Gateway to the Americas International Bridge, a bridge over the Rio Grande (Río Bravo), between Laredo, Texas, United States and Nuevo Laredo, Tamaulipas, Mexico